Untold Legends is a series of role-playing video games that has three installments:

Untold Legends: Brotherhood of the Blade, a PlayStation Portable launch title
Untold Legends: The Warrior's Code, sequel to PSP game
Untold Legends: Dark Kingdom, PlayStation 3 launch title